New Amsterdam is a town located in Washington Township, Harrison County, Indiana, United States, along the Ohio River. As of the 2020 census, the city population was 12. As of the 2020 Census, New Amsterdam was the smallest city, town, or Census Designated Place in the state of Indiana.

History

The first settlers in what became New Amsterdam were James Riley and Jacob Youstler. Starting in 1815, they lived in New Amsterdam for several years before relocating further north.  The town was formally platted on September 19, 1815, by Jacob Funk and Samuel McAdams.

The town relied on the Ohio River for its growth, as it was the main transportation route for migrating settlers as well as traders up and down river. Steamboats were active on the river during the 19th century and contributed to the growth of waterfront towns. In the 1860 census, New Amsterdam was the largest town in Harrison County.

Floods played a large part in the decline of the town. The Great Ohio River flood of 1937 destroyed 75% of the structures in the town. The only original building remaining in the town is the old country store. A marker on the second story of the building shows the height of the water in the 1937 Flood.

Today, the town has a general store, a Baptist church, a Methodist church, a town hall and a cemetery.

Geography 
New Amsterdam is located at  (38.101894, -86.274821).

Demographics

2020 census
As of the census of 2020, there were 12 people and 6 occupied housing units in the town. The racial makeup of the town was 91.7% White and 8% Black. The town lost significant population between the 2010 census (27 people) and the 2020 census (12 people), passing River Forest as the smallest municipality in the state.

2010 census 
As of the census of 2010, there were 27 people, 11 households, and 8 families residing in the town. The population density was 337.5 inhabitants per square mile (130.3/km2). There were 20 housing units at an average density of 250.0 per square mile (96.5/km2). The racial makeup of the town was 85.2% White, 11.1% from other races, and 3.7% from two or more races. Hispanic or Latino of any race were 11.1% of the population.

There were 11 households, of which 36.4% had children under the age of 18 living with them, 54.5% were married couples living together, 18.2% had a male householder with no wife present, and 27.3% were non-families. 27.3% of all households were made up of individuals. The average household size was 2.45 and the average family size was 2.75.

The median age in the town was 42.3 years. 29.6% of residents were under the age of 18; 0% were between the ages of 18 and 24; 25.9% were from 25 to 44; 25.9% were from 45 to 64; and 18.5% were 65 years of age or older. The gender makeup of the town was 55.6% male and 44.4% female.

Area events
The New Amsterdam Festival, also known as Remembrance Day, was held the third Saturday of April. The final year for the festival was 2014.

See also
 List of cities and towns along the Ohio River
 Ohio River flood of 1937

References

Towns in Harrison County, Indiana
Towns in Indiana
Louisville metropolitan area
Indiana populated places on the Ohio River